Sanyu Robinah Mweruka (née Sanyu Robinah Nalubwama, born 1987) is a Ugandan news anchor, television presenter at Bukedde Television, a Luganda language media house which is part of the New Vision Group in Uganda.

Education background 
Robinah graduated from Uganda Media Consultants and Trainers (UMCAT) after her specializing in radio and television production.

Career
Mweruka is a news anchor of the Luganda broadcast news program Agataliiko Nfuufu and Agabutikidde. She is also a television presenter of the program Omuntu Wa Bantu, and also television producer on the Bukedde Television. Prior to joining Bukedde Television, she was a reporter on Bukedde FM, a radio station owned by the same media conglomerate. She transferred from the radio station to the television station in 2009.

Family
Sanyu Robinah Mweruka is married to Paschal Mweruka since May 2010. As of November 2018, they are the parents of five children, aged 7 years, 5 years, 3 years, 2 years and two months.

Controversy
In early 2015, a videotape began circulating on social media platforms, showing what appeared to be Sanyu Robinah Mweruka in compromising positions, with a man who was not her husband. The man in the videotape was identified as Kizito Ongom, also known as Kasumaali, a kickboxer and heavy weight lifter. In an interview with The Observer Newspaper, Kizito Ongom denied that he was the man in the tape.

Sanyu also maintains that she is not the woman in the tape. Her position is that her facial features were photoshopped into that tape. Her husband stands by his wife and refuses to divorce her. He states that efforts were made to extort money from the couple, using that tape, as early as prior to their wedding, five years earlier.

Other considerations
In 2015, Sanyu released a single record called Tonvuddemu (You Have Not Forsaken Me), praising her husband for sticking with her through their marital ups and downs.

See also
Josephine Karungi
Faridah Nakazibwe

References

External links
"Tonvuddemu" by Sanyu Robinah Mweruka (Video) At Youtube.com

1987 births
Living people
Ganda people
Ugandan journalists
Ugandan women journalists
Ugandan women television journalists
People from Central Region, Uganda
Victims of cyberbullying